Parfait Guiagon (born 22 February 2001) is an Ivorian footballer who currently plays as a midfielder for Maccabi Tel Aviv. He was included in The Guardian's "Next Generation 2018".

Career statistics

Club

Notes

References

2001 births
Living people
Ivorian footballers
Africa Sports d'Abidjan players
Maccabi Tel Aviv F.C. players
Beitar Tel Aviv Bat Yam F.C. players
Maccabi Netanya F.C. players
Israeli Premier League players
Liga Leumit players
Ivorian expatriate footballers
Expatriate footballers in Israel
Ivorian expatriate sportspeople in Israel
Footballers at the 2020 Summer Olympics
Association football midfielders
Olympic footballers of Ivory Coast